, often literally translated into English as pork bowl, is a Japanese dish consisting of a bowl of rice topped with pork simmered in a mildly sweet sauce. It also often includes a sprinkling of green peas. A popular food in Japan, it is commonly served with takuan. Buta means "pig" or "pork", and don is short for donburi, the Japanese word for "bowl".
Butadon originated from the city of Obihiro, Japan.

References

See also
 Gyūdon

Japanese pork dishes
Japanese rice dishes